Castelnau's antshrike (Thamnophilus cryptoleucus) is a species of bird in the family Thamnophilidae.  It is found in Brazil, Colombia, Ecuador, and Peru.  Its natural habitats are riverine subtropical or tropical moist lowland forests and heavily degraded former forest.

References

Castelnau's antshrike
Birds of the Amazon Basin
Birds of the Ecuadorian Amazon
Birds of the Peruvian Amazon
Castelnau's antshrike
Taxonomy articles created by Polbot